Stars on Trial is a MuchMusic television special based on the MuchMusic television program Video on Trial. It premiered in late December 2005, as part of the network's annual "Holiday Wrap." Stars on Trial uses basically the same concept as Video on Trial. However, the special was a full hour long as opposed to being a half-hour long and took place in an actual courtroom set instead of a black background set. Also, the jury analyzed celebrities themselves instead of just music videos.

The show was MuchMusic's highest rated special of the year other than the MuchMusic Video Awards and remains the highest rated comedy special in the network's history (not including VOT Holiday specials which are holiday-themed regular episodes).

Cast
Ron Sparks as The Judge
Tim McAuliffe as Rusty Waters (The Bailiff)

Jurors
Trevor Boris
Debra DiGiovanni
Sabrina Jalees
Jemeni
David Kerr
Fraser Young

Verdicts
As in Video on Trial, these verdicts are of a humorous nature.

External links 
 

Much (TV channel) original programming